This list of marine molluscs of Chile is a partial list of marine mollusc species which have been recorded in Chile. In other words, it is a list of salt water species of snails, clams and other molluscs. The list does not include land snails or slugs, or freshwater snails or clams.

Polyplacophora
Order: Neoloricata

Chaetopleuridae
 Chaetopleura peruviana

Chitonidae
 Acanthopleura echinata (Barnes, 1824)
Chiton granosus
Chiton magnificus (Deshayes, 1844)
Tonicia atrata
Tonicia chilensis
Tonicia disjuncta
Tonicia lebruni

Ischnochitonidae
 Chaetopleura angulata (Spengler, 1797)
 Chaetopleura benaventei
 Chaetopleura peruviana
 Ischnochiton pusio (Sowerby in Sow. & Brod, 1832)

Mopaliidae
 Plaxiphora aurata

Gastropoda
Patellidae
 Cellana ardosioea (Hombron & Jacquinot, 1841)

Cypraeidae
 Cypraea caputdraconis (Melvill, 1888)
 Cypraea englerti (Summers & Burgess, 1965)

Muricidae
 Chorus giganteus
 Concholepas concholepas - also referred as Chilean abalone. Local name: Loco
 Thais chocolata (Duclos, 1832) - local name: Locate
 Thais delessertiana (D'Orbigny, 1841)
 Thais haemastoma (Linnaeus, 1758)
 Xanthochorus buxeus
 Xanthochorus cassidiformis

Turbinellidae
 Columbarium tomicici (McLean & Andrade, 1982)

Bivalvia

Mytiloida
Mytilidae
 Aulacomya ater - local name Cholga
 Choromytilus chorus - local name Choro zapato
 Mytilus platensis (d'Orbigny, 1842) - local name Chorito 
 Mytilus edulis - local name Choro
 Perna perna (Linnaeus, 1758) - local name Navaja or Huepo

Veneroida
Solenidae
 Ensis macha (Molina, 1782) - local name  Navajuela

Veneridae
 Protothaca thaca (Molina, 1782) - local name: Almeja

Mesodesmatidae (Gray, 1839)
 Mesodesma donacium - local name: Macha

Ostreoida
Pectinidae
 Chlamys purpurata - local name: Ostión
 Chlamys patagonica - local name: Ostión del sur or Ostión patagónico

Ostreidae (Rafinesque, 1815)
 Crassostrea gigas - local name: Ostra del Pacífico
 Ostrea chilensis - local name: Ostra chilena

Cephalopoda

Teuthida
Ommastrephidae
 Dosidicus gigas (D'Orbigny, 1835). Also known as Humboldt squid.

Octopoda
Octopodidae
 Enteroctopus megalocyathus (Gould, 1852) - local name: Pulpo de Chiloé
 Octopus mimus

See also
List of non-marine molluscs of Chile
Wildlife of Chile

References

 List of Chilean molluscs

Further reading 
 Ashton T. (2007). A Field Guide to Molluscs of Northern Chile. 112 pp.

Marine
Molluscs
Chile, marine
Chile, Marine
.Chile
Chile